Pompey's Pillar may refer to:
 Pompey's Pillar (column), an ancient column in Alexandria, Egypt
 Pompeys Pillar National Monument, a large rock formation in Montana, USA, named after a member of the Lewis and Clark Expedition 
 Pompey's Pillar, Montana, an unincorporated community in Montana, named after the rock formation
 Pompeys Pillar (South Australia), a mountain in Wilpena Pound
 The Pillar of Pompey, an ancient altar on the European side of the Symplegades